Frederick Spence (10 March 1902 – 18 June 1986) was a South African cricketer. He played in nine first-class matches for Border from 1934/35 to 1937/38.

See also
 List of Border representative cricketers

References

External links
 

1902 births
1986 deaths
South African cricketers
Border cricketers
People from Queenstown, South Africa
Cricketers from the Eastern Cape